The Kunitomo air gun was an air rifle circa 1820, by the Japanese inventor Kunitomo Ikkansai who developed various manufacturing methods for guns and also created an air gun based on the study of Western knowledge ("rangaku") acquired from the Dutch in Dejima.

See also

 Girardoni M1780 repeating air rifle
 List of air guns

Weapons of Japan
Air guns